Elmer Ray George (July 15, 1928 – May 31, 1976) was an American race car driver.

Born in Hockerville, Oklahoma, George died in Terre Haute, Indiana.  He drove in the AAA and USAC Championship Car series, racing in the 1956–1963 seasons with 64 starts, including the Indianapolis 500 races in 1957, 1962, and 1963.

He finished in the top ten 36 times, with one victory, in 1957 at Syracuse.

George was also the 1957 USAC Sprint Car Series champion.

Complete AAA/USAC Championship Car results

Indianapolis 500 results

World Championship career summary
The Indianapolis 500 was part of the FIA World Championship from 1950 through 1960. Drivers competing at Indy during those years were credited with World Championship points and participation. George participated in the 1957 Indianapolis 500, his only World Championship race. He finished 33rd and did not accumulate any championship points.

1962 Bobby Ball Memorial race
On November 18, 1962, George suffered cuts and a left shoulder injury in a USAC Champ Car race held at the Arizona State Fairgrounds. Having hit another car's bumper, George lost control of his HOW Special, hit the guard rail before the grandstand, slid and headed towards the stands where he broke through a chain-link fence, landing upside down. 22 spectators were injured as a result.

Personal
Elmer George was married to Mari Hulman George, daughter of Tony Hulman, owner of the Indianapolis Motor Speedway. Elmer and Mari had three daughters and one son, Tony George, founder of the Indy Racing League, and Ex-CEO of the Indianapolis Motor Speedway. Elmer had two children from a previous marriage, Joseph F. George and Carolyn Coffey.

During the late 1960s and early 1970s, George was the director of the Indianapolis Motor Speedway Radio Network.

On May 3, 1976, Mari filed for divorce. On the day of the 1976 Indianapolis 500 (May 30, 1976), Elmer George argued by telephone with Guy Trolinger, a horse trainer at the family farm near Terre Haute, and Mari's alleged boyfriend. After the race, George drove to the farm, broke into the house and confronted Trolinger, then around 1:00 a.m., gunfire broke out, and George was shot and killed as a result of multiple gunshot wounds. A grand jury ruled that Trolinger killed George in self-defense at which charges were dropped.

Award
He was inducted in the National Sprint Car Hall of Fame in 2005.

References

1928 births
1976 deaths
Hulman-George_family
People from Ottawa County, Oklahoma
Racing drivers from Oklahoma
Indianapolis 500 drivers
AAA Championship Car drivers
National Sprint Car Hall of Fame inductees